Viktor Lőrincz (born 28 April 1990) is a Hungarian Greco-Roman wrestler. He won the bronze medal in the 84 kg division at the 2013 World Wrestling Championships.

References

External links 
 
 
 
 

1990 births
Living people
Hungarian male sport wrestlers
World Wrestling Championships medalists
Wrestlers at the 2016 Summer Olympics
Olympic wrestlers of Hungary
Wrestlers at the 2019 European Games
European Games medalists in wrestling
European Games bronze medalists for Hungary
Wrestlers at the 2020 Summer Olympics
Olympic medalists in wrestling
Medalists at the 2020 Summer Olympics
Olympic silver medalists for Hungary
People from Cegléd
Sportspeople from Pest County